The House of Malatesta was an Italian family that ruled over Rimini from 1295 until 1500, as well as (in different periods) other lands and towns in Romagna and holding high positions in the government of cities in present day Tuscany, Lombardy and Marche. The dynasty is considered among the most important and influential of the Late Middle Ages. In the period of maximum influence, they extended their domains along the Marche coast, up to Ascoli Piceno, Senigallia, Sansepolcro and Citerna, and to the north, on the territories of Bergamo and Brescia.

History

The family's progenitor is said to be Rodolfo of Carpegna whose fighting spirit yielded him the sobriquet mala testa ("bad head"). From 1004 on he built a castle on the rock of Pennabilli.

In the 11th century the family had possessions in the region of Gabicce Mare, Gatteo and Poggio Berni. Giovanni Malatesta  (d. 1150) owned some land between rivers Marecchia and Rubicon, and was the first to settle down in Rimini. His son married into the Traversari family who were lords of Ravenna and Rimini during the 12th and 13th centuries. In 1186 the Malatesta became lords of Torriana. Giovanni's grandsons Giovanni and  Malatesta I Malatesta (1183–1248) founded the branches of the Counts of Sogliano al Rubicone (extinguished in 1640) and "della Penna" of Pennabilli and Verucchio (until 1462). In 1216 they became citizens of Rimini.

Malatesta I became podestà (chief magistrate) of Pistoia in 1228 and of Rimini in 1239 and 1247. During the struggles between papal and imperial followers (Guelphs and Ghibellines), he supported emperor Frederick II. His son however, Malatesta da Verucchio (d. 1312), switched sides after the emperor's defeat near Parma in 1248, and became leader of the Guelphs while Guido I. of Montefeltro took the lead of the Ghibellines in the Marche and Romagna regions. Malatesta da Verucchio made himself sole master of the city ("signore") after the expulsion of the family's Ghibelline rivals, the Parcitadi, in 1295. His hunchback son Giovanni Malatesta is chiefly famous because he murdered his wife Francesca da Polenta and his younger brother Paolo in 1285, having discovered them in adultery, and the murder is recorded in Dante's Inferno as well as in a story by Giovanni Boccaccio.

Malatestino I, Giovanni's brother, became capitano of the Guelphs of Bologna in 1296 and of Florence in 1303. In 1312 he destroyed his Ghibelline cousins' castle at Sogliano, and in 1312 followed his father as lord of Rimini. During the fourteenth and fifteenth centuries, the Malatestas ruled over a number of cities in the Romagna and the Marche, including Pesaro, Fano, Cesena, Fossombrone and Cervia. Several Malatestas were condottieri at the service of various Italian states. Malatesta Novello built the Malatestiana Library at Cesena from 1447 to 1452.

The most famous was Sigismondo Pandolfo Malatesta, who was engaged in conflict with the papacy over territorial claims, as well as with his rival Federico da Montefeltro. In the end, he lost almost all of his territories, except for Rimini that he held with the support of the Republic of Venice. He had however built the cathedral of Rimini, the Tempio Malatestiano, from 1450. His grandson Pandolfo was eventually expelled from Rimini in 1500 by Cesare Borgia and the city was finally incorporated in the Papal States in 1528, after the last failed attempt of Pandolfo's son, Sigismondo. During the 16th and 17th centuries, the family still provided a number of condottieri, the Sogliano branch extinguished in 1640, the last of the Rimini branch was the Jesuit Roberto Malatesta (d. 1708), the Ghiaggiolo branch extinguished with Lamberto in 1757.

Malatesta Family Members

(1) Malatesta dalla Penna (d.1248)
(2) Malatesta da Verucchio (d.1312) (son of 1.) - Lord of Rimini, 1295

1st generation:
(3) Malatestino 'dell'Occhio' (d.1316) (son of 2) - Lord of Rimini, 1312
(4) Paolo 'il Bello' (d.1285) (son of 2) - murdered by 5
(5) Giovanni 'Gianciotto' (d.1304) (son of 2)
(6) Pandolfo I (d.1326) (son of 2) - Lord of Rimini, 1317

2nd generation: 
di Malatestino:
(7) Ferrantino (d.1353) (son of 3) - Lord of Rimini, 1326, deposed & imprisoned by 11, 1334
di Paolo:
(9) Ramberto (d.1330) (son of 4) - murdered by 14
(10) Guido the Archpriest (d.1334?) (son of 4)
di Gianciotto
(8) Uberto, Count of Giaggolo (d.1323) (son of 5) - murdered by 9
di Pandolfo:
(11) Malatesta II 'Guastafamiglia' (d.1364) (son of 6) - Lord of Pesaro, 1326; and Rimini, 1334
(12) Galeotto I (d.1385) (son of 6) - Lord of Rimini,&c.

3rd generation:

di Ferrantino:
(13) Pandolfino (d.?) (son of 7)
(14) Malatestino Novello (d.1335) (son of 7) - imprisoned & prob. murdered by 11.
di Malatesta:
(15) Malatesta 'Ungaro' (d. 1364) (son of 11) - Lord of Jesi
(16) Pandolfo II (d.1373) (son of 11) - Lord of Pesaro
di Galeotto:
(17) Carlo of Rimini (son of 12) - Lord of Rimini
(18) Pandolfo III of Fano (d.1427) (son of 12) - Lord of Fano
(19) Andrea of Cesena (son of 12) (d.1416) - Lord of Cesena
(20) Galeotto II of Cervia (son of 12) (d.) - Lord of Cervia

4th generation

di Pandolfino:
(21) Ferrantino Novello (d.1352) (son of 13)
(22) Guido (d.1334) (son of 13) - imprisoned & probably murdered by 11

Family tree of Malatesta

See also
House of Malatesta members

References

Sources

 J. Larner (1965) The Lords of Romagna: Romagnol society and the origins of the Signorie, Ithaca: Cornell University Press, p. 243
P. H. Wicksteed and E.G. Gardner, (1902) Dante and Giovanni del Virgilio, Westminster: Archibald Constable, p. 249, 336

External links
Catholic Encyclopedia article

 
Malatesta